Saddle Mountain (Grand Canyon) is an 8,424-foot-elevation summit located in the eastern Grand Canyon, in Coconino County of northern Arizona, United States. It is the highest peak within Grand Canyon National Park and it forms a portion of the northeast border of the park. Point Imperial, the last viewpoint north, on the Walhalla Plateau, is ~2.0 southwest. Saddle Mountain contains the Saddle Mountain Wilderness, and the Saddle Mountain Wilderness Trail. The short Saddle Creek drains the mountain to the Colorado River (Marble Canyon region), northeast, and the large Nankoweap Creek drainage drains the entire length of the mountain, about 25 mi, to the south, then east.

References

Grand Canyon National Park
Landforms of Coconino County, Arizona